Summer Solstice: Bee Stings is part two of the four part Seasons collective created by Coil.

Release history
The 7" was limited to 1300 copies on honey yellow vinyl and 50 copies on green vinyl. the CD version was unlimited, but deleted on autumn equinox 1998, when the third part of the series was released. On summer solstice 2001 a second CD edition was released and this was limited to 400 copies.

This album was re-released on Moons Milk (In Four Phases). This album will again be re-released on Moon's Milk In Six Phases.

A remix of "Glowworms/Waveforms" entitled "Glowworms/Waveforms - Obsidian Monarch (Full Version)" by Thread appeared on the CD compilation Otology: The Brainwashed 7" Singles Compiled.

Side A is meant to be played at 45 rpm while side B is meant to be played at 33½ rpm.

Track listing

7" Version
Side A
"Bee Stings"  – 4:56
Side B
"Summer Substructures"  – 8:11

CD Version
 "Bee Stings"  – 4:56
 "Glowworms/Waveforms"  – 5:54
 "Summer Substructures"  – 8:11
 "A Warning from the Sun (For Fritz)"  – 5:01

References

External links
 
 
 Summer Solstice: Bee Stings at Brainwashed

1998 EPs
Coil (band) EPs